Scarborough Southwest is a provincial electoral district in Ontario, Canada, that has been represented in the Legislative Assembly of Ontario since 1999.

Geography
It covers the southwestern part of the Scarborough part of Toronto.  It stretches from Lake Ontario in the south to Eglinton Avenue in the north.

It consists of the part of the City of Toronto bounded on the west by Victoria Park Avenue, on the south by Lake Ontario, on the north by Eglinton Avenue and on the east by Markham Road.

The riding includes the neighbourhoods of Birch Cliff, Oakridge, Cliffside, Kennedy Park, Clairlea, Cliffcrest and parts of Scarborough Village and the Golden Mile.

The provincial electoral district was created in 1999 when provincial ridings were defined to have the same borders as federal ridings.

Members of Provincial Parliament

Election results

2007 electoral reform referendum

References

External links
Elections Ontario Past Election Results
Map of riding for 2018 election

Provincial electoral districts of Toronto
Scarborough, Toronto